is a German word that means a unity of prose and music. Initially coined by Theodor Mundt in 1833, it was most notably used by Richard Wagner, along with Gesamtkunstwerk, to define his operas.

Usage 

Mundt formulated his definition explicitly in contrast to intermezzo, or a piece that sits in between dramatic entities. To this day,  is associated with the works of Richard Wagner where poetry, music and stage performances were not arbitrarily combined. Wagner himself composed the music and libretto and was a consultant on the stage design and choreography.

Wagner himself resisted calling his works , which would imply a drama "meant for music," like a libretto. Instead he wanted to put music at the service of the drama, which indeed in its original ancient Greek form was inseparable from music. Nevertheless, the term music drama has become accepted. A major characteristic of Musikdrama is its formal unity, without interruptions or smaller closed forms such as arias or duets. Recurring leitmotifs provide support and interpretation of the text, which progresses as in a spoken drama.

References 
 Riemann Musiklexikon, Mainz 1967, Sachteil, p.605.
 Richard Wagner, "Über die Benennung Musikdrama", in: Wagner, R., Gesammelte Schriften und Dichtungen, Leipzig: Siegel 1907, vol. 9, 

German words and phrases
Opera terminology
Richard Wagner